The 2005 Men's Hockey Hamburg Masters was the eleventh edition of the Hamburg Masters, consisting of a series of test matches. It was held in Hamburg, Germany, from 12 to 14 August 2005, and featured four of the top nations in men's field hockey.

Competition format
The tournament featured the national teams of Australia, the Netherlands, Pakistan, and the hosts, Germany, competing in a round-robin format, with each team playing each other once. Three points were awarded for a win, one for a draw, and none for a loss.

Officials
The following umpires were appointed by the International Hockey Federation to officiate the tournament:

 David Gentles (AUS)
 Bart de Liefde (NED)
 Markus Petter (GER)
 James Pilgrim (ENG)
 Haider Rasool (PAK)

Results
All times are local (Central European Summer Time).

Pool

Fixtures

Statistics

Final standings

Goalscorers

References

External links
Deutscher Hockey-Bund

2004
Men's
2005 in Australian sport
2005 in Dutch sport
2005 in German sport
Sport in Hamburg
August 2005 sports events in Europe